The Spring-Ford Area School District is a K-12 school district based in Montgomery County, Pennsylvania, United States, which expands into Chester County. The District is made up of Limerick Township and Upper Providence Township, along with the boroughs of Royersford and Spring City.

The school district has 7 elementary schools (K–4), a 5–6 grade center, a 7th grade center, an 8th grade center, a 9th grade center, and a senior high school (10–12).

The growing community of approximately 50,990 straddles the US-422 bypass and offers the best of both a small-town atmosphere and proximity to metropolitan attractions. The district is characterized by small towns, suburban neighborhoods and rural areas, with the name being denoted through the combination of Spring City and Royersford, to make the name Spring-Ford. The location offers easy access to the cultural appeal of Philadelphia, as well as the warmth and nurturing feel of suburban America.  
The district is approximately twenty miles northwest of Philadelphia, PA, twenty-five miles south of Reading, Pennsylvania, and five miles north of Valley Forge, Pennsylvania. The district has a combined land area of 44.4 square miles, and the 2020 US Census population of the district is 50,990, compared to 47,368 in 2010 and 36,483 in 2000.

Curriculum
In 1966 the high school began having graphic arts and power mechanics classes.

References

External links
 Spring-Ford District Webpage

School districts established in 1956
School districts in Chester County, Pennsylvania
School districts in Montgomery County, Pennsylvania
1956 establishments in Pennsylvania